Reflex Paramoteur was a French aircraft manufacturer founded by Dominique Cholou and his son Ronan Cholou and based in Chatou. The company specialized in the design and manufacture of paramotors in the form of ready-to-fly aircraft for the US FAR 103 Ultralight Vehicles rules and the European Fédération Aéronautique Internationale microlight category.

The company seems to have been founded before 2001 and gone out of business in about 2010.

The company produced a range of paramotors, including the mid-2000s Reflex Bi Trike, J 160, J 320, Model S,  Solo Elec and the later Classic, Dynamic and Reflex Top Box.

Aircraft

References

External links
Company website archives on Archive.org

Defunct aircraft manufacturers of France
Ultralight aircraft
Powered parachutes
Paramotors